Richard Puskyn, Rector of Bodfari, was Dean of St Asaph from 1543 until 1556.

References 

16th-century Welsh Anglican priests
Deans of St Asaph